The 2018 NCAA Skiing Championships took place from March 7 to March 10 in Steamboat Springs, Colorado, at the Steamboat Ski Resort. The tournament went into its 65th consecutive NCAA Skiing Championships, and featured twenty-three teams across all divisions.

Team results

 Note: Top 10 only
 (H): Team from hosting U.S. state

Individual results

 Note: Table does not include consolation
 (H): Individual from hosting U.S. State

References

2018 in American sports
2018 in sports in Colorado